The Hungarian Handball Federation (MKSZ)  is the national handball federation in Hungary.

The Hungarian Handball Federation is a member of the European Handball Federation (EHF) and the International Handball Federation (IHF). Its headquarters are in Budapest. The federation organizes the Hungarian league for men and women, and administers the national handball teams for men and women.

Its president is Máté Kocsis, the Secretary General is András Novák.

Hosted tournaments
Men's
2022 European Men's Handball Championship (with ), January 13–30
2005 Men's Junior World Handball Championship
2013 Men's Youth World Handball Championship, August 10–23

Women's
1982 World Women's Handball Championship, December 2–12
1995 World Women's Handball Championship (with ), December 5–17
2004 European Women's Handball Championship, December 9–19
2014 European Women's Handball Championship (with ), December 7–21
2001 Women's Junior World Handball Championship
2018 Women's Junior World Handball Championship
2009 Women's Junior European Handball Championship
2019 Women's Junior European Handball Championship
1992 Women's Youth European Handball Championship

Beach handball
2016 Beach Handball World Championships, Budapest, July 12–17

Honours
Men's
 World Championship:  Runner-up (1 time - 1986)
Carpathian Trophy:  Bronze medal - 1964, 1976

Women's
 Olympic Games:  Runner-up (1 time - 2000);  Third place (2 times - 1976, 1996)
 World Championship:  Winner (1 time - 1965);  Runner-up (4 times - 1957, 1982, 1995, 2003);  Third place (4 times - 1971, 1975, 1978, 2005)
 European Championship:  Winner (1 time - 2000);  Third place (3 times - 1998, 2004, 2012)
Carpathian Trophy:  Silver medal - 1971, 1984, 2012;  Bronze medal - 1970, 1975, 1981, 2011
Møbelringen Cup:  Silver medal - 2003

Divisions

Men's
Hungary men's national handball team
Hungary men's national junior handball team
Hungary men's national youth handball team
Hungary national beach handball team

Women's
Hungary women's national handball team
Hungary women's national junior handball team
Hungary women's national youth handball team
Hungary women's national beach handball team

Current head coaches

Competitions 
Magyar Kézilabda Szövetség is responsible for organising the following competitions:

Men's handball
Nemzeti Bajnokság I (Tier 1)
Nemzeti Bajnokság I/B (Tier 2) – two sections (East, West) 
Nemzeti Bajnokság II (Tier 3) – six sections (North-West, North, North-East, South-West, South, South-East)

Women's handball
Nemzeti Bajnokság I (women) (Tier 1)
Nemzeti Bajnokság I/B (women) (Tier 2) – two sections (East, West)
Nemzeti Bajnokság II (women) (Tier 3) – six sections (North-West, North, North-East, South-West, South, South-East)

Cups
Magyar Kupa – Men
Szuperkupa – Men's Supercup
Magyar Kupa (women) – Women
Szuperkupa (women) – Women's Supercup

Beach handball
Strandkézilabda Nemzeti Bajnokság (Tier 1)

Presidents

Current sponsorships
Szerencsejáték Zrt. - Official main sponsor
Provident - Official sponsor (Platinum support)
Mercedes-Benz - Official sponsor (Gold support)
MTVA - Official sponsor
Generali - Official sponsor
Adidas - Official sponsor
Molten - Official sponsor
Sport Basica - Official sponsor
Haluxvill - Official sponsor
LBT - Official sponsor

See also
 Hungarian handball clubs in European competitions
 Hungarian handball league system

References

External links 
Magyar Kézilabda Szövetség (Official website) 
Hungary at EHF site

Handball in Hungary
Handball
Hungary
Handball
1933 establishments in Hungary
Sports organizations established in 1933